Bagua is a city in Peru located about  from the city of Chachapoyas. It lies in the province of the same name.

See also
2005 northern Peru earthquake
2009 Peruvian political crisis

References

External links
 Bagua Homepage (in Spanish)

Populated places in the Amazonas Region